"Green" is a song by Australian singer-songwriter Alex Lloyd. The song was released on 18 February 2002 as the third single from his second studio album, Watching Angels Mend (2001). It peaked at number 25 in Australia.

Track listing
CD single (5504392)
 "Green"
 "Amazing" (live at Channel V)	
 "Lucky Star" (live at Channel V)	
 "Momo" (live at Channel V)

Charts

Release history

References

2001 songs
2002 singles
Alex Lloyd songs
EMI Records singles